Nai Mueang is a small town and tambon (sub-district) of Phichai District, in Uttaradit Province, Thailand. In 2005 it had a population of  people. The tambon contains eight villages.

References

Tambon of Uttaradit province
Populated places in Uttaradit province